Claudia Rompen (born 27 January 1997) is a Dutch handball player for HH Elite and the Dutch national team.

She was selected as part of the Dutch 35-player squad for the 2020 European Women's Handball Championship.

References

1997 births
Living people
Dutch female handball players
Expatriate handball players
Dutch expatriate sportspeople in Denmark
21st-century Dutch women